Laurie Warder  (born 23 October 1962) is a former professional male tennis player from Australia who specialized in the doubles event. In 1987 he lost the doubles title at the Australian Open partnering compatriot Peter Doohan, but won the event in 1993 partnering South African Danie Visser. Warder won 12 doubles titles during his career and achieved a highest doubles ranking of No. 12 in October 1991.

Career finals

Doubles (12 titles, 18 runner-ups)

External links
 
 

Australian male tennis players
Australian Open (tennis) champions
Tennis players from Sydney
1962 births
Living people
Grand Slam (tennis) champions in men's doubles